The Battle of Yating occurred in November, 1898 in Mount Yating, Pilar, Capiz province, between the colonial forces of the Spanish Empire and that of Ejercito Libertador of Provisional Revolutionary Government of Visayas under the Visayan "female General" Teresa "Nay Isa" Magbanua. The Ejercito Libertador were victorious in this battle. Teresa Magbanua and her troops will score a yet another victory in the battle of Sapong Hills in Sara, District of Concepcion (now part of Iloilo Province).

See also
Battle of Tres de Abril
Battle of Sapong Hills

References

Battles of the Philippine Revolution
History of Capiz